The following table presents images of the rank insignia used by the Russian Aerospace Forces. The Russia inherited the ranks of the Soviet Union, although the insignia and uniform was altered a little, especially the re-introduction of the old Tsarist crown and double eagle. The Russian Aerospace Forces follow the same rank structure as the Russian Ground Forces, with the addition of the title "of aviation" to each officer's rank, now abandoned.

Russian armed forces have two styles of ranks: troop ranks (army style ranks) and deck ranks (navy style ranks). The army uses troop ranks, and so does the Air Force. The following table of Ranks is based on those of the Russian Federation. The Russian Federation eliminated the descriptor "of Aviation" following ranks; however, common use of this is being abolished altogether. The rank of a serviceman of a "Guards" unit or  formation may be followed by the word Guards. The rank of a citizen of the legal, medical or veterinary professions shall be followed by the words of Justice, of the Medical service, or of the Veterinary service,  to their respective ranks. The rank of a citizen having reserve or retired status shall be followed by the word Reserve or Retired, respectively.

Table of ranks 
The rank insignia shown here are in the current duty uniforms; the new parade dress uniform epaulettes are air force blue for NCOs and airmen and gold and blue for the officer corps while the current everyday dress uniforms retain the old design save for NCOs and airmen epaulette insignia.

See also

Comparative military ranks
Ranks and insignia of space forces
Russian military ranks
Ranks and insignia of the Soviet military

References

External links
 Federal Law No. 58-FZ from March 12, 1998 "On military duty and military service"  (in Russian)
 Presidential Decree No. 531 from May 8, 2005 "On military uniform, rank insignia of the servicemen and state bodies' rank isnignia"  (in Russian)
Military Ranks of Russia
Russian military

 01
.
Russian Federation
Russian Federation Air Force